The Qian River is the name of a short section of the Xi River system and, thus, the greater Pearl River system in Guangxi, China.  It is formed by where the Liu Jiang meets the larger Hongshui He east of Laibin, then flows southeast through Wuxuan.  At Guiping it is joined by the more southerly Yu Jiang to form the Xun branch of the Xi Jiang.  The Qian, for most of its length, winds between the Dayao and Lianhua Mountains, before entering the valley just below Xishan Mountain west of Guiping.

Rivers of Guangxi
Rivers of Guangdong
Tributaries of the Pearl River (China)